Ras association domain-containing protein 2 is a protein that in humans is encoded by the RASSF2 gene.

This gene encodes a protein that contains a Ras association domain. Similar to its cattle and sheep counterparts, this gene is located near the prion gene. Two alternatively spliced transcripts encoding the same isoform have been reported.

Interactions
RASSF2 has been shown to interact with KRAS.

References

Further reading